The CA class were a group of midget submarines built for the Italian Navy during World War II.

Design

These submarines were designed by the Caproni Company and built in great secrecy. They were originally designed for coast defence but later modified as clandestine attack craft similar to the British X craft.

Boats

Service 
In 1942, after the United States entered the war, Junio Valerio Borghese, commander of the Decima MAS (the Italian Navy's special operations unit), devised a plan to attack New York Harbor using a CA type midget submarine and commando frogmen. The midget submarine would be transported across the Atlantic by being carried on the deck of a larger submarine. The Italian submarine  was chosen for the task and modified at the Italian base in Bordeaux (BETASOM). CA 2 was transported by rail from Italy and trials, which were conducted near La Pallice, were supervised by Borghese himself during late 1942. Leonardo Da Vinci was sunk in May 1943 before the operation could be carried out. No new boat was available and the Italian Armistice stopped further planning.

See also
 Italian submarines of World War II

References

Bibliography
 Conway's All the World's Fighting Ships 1922-46
 Kemp, Paul: Underwater Warriors (1996, Arms & Armour Press)

External links
 Classe CA Marina Militare website

Submarine classes
Submarines of the Regia Marina
Midget submarines
 CA class
Caproni